Vito Mielnicki Jr. (born May 10, 2002) is an American professional boxer. As an amateur, Mielnicki was a four time Junior National Golden Gloves champion.

Professional career

Early career
On July 13, 2019, Mielnicki made his professional debut against Tamarcus Smith. Mielnicki won the bout after knocking Smith out with a right hand, just over a minute into the opening round. Mielnicki second bout as a professional was against Caleb Bailey on September 20, 2019. Mielnicki secured victory after knocking his opponent down twice in the first round.

Mielnicki fought against Marklin Bailey on the undercard of Deontay Wilder vs. Luis Ortiz II on November 23, 2019. In the fourth round, Mielnicki landed a series of punches which caused Bailey to stumble backwards, causing referee Russell Mora to step in and end the bout. Mielnicki was taken the full distance for the first time in his professional career when he fought against Preston Wilson on January 18, 2020. Mielnicki was dominant throughout the bout and sealed victory after winning every round on each of the three scorecards.

Mielnicki's fifth bout as a professional was on the undercard of Deontay Wilder vs. Tyson Fury II against Corey Champion on February 22, 2020. Towards the end of the opening round, Mielnicki landed a flurry of punches which knocked his opponent down onto the canvas. Champion recovered from the knockdown, but despite this, Mielnicki proceeded to dominate the remainder of the fight and won via wide unanimous decision. On August 8, 2020, Mielnicki fought against Chris Rollins. In the second round, Mielnicki landed a heavy right hand which visibly hurt his opponent. Mielnicki proceeded to land several power shots until a final big right hand shot forced referee, Jerry Cantu, to step in and stop the bout in the second round.

Mielnicki was taken the full fight distance for the third time as a professional when he fought Steven Pulluaim on December 5, 2020. Mielnicki knocked his opponent down in both the first and second round, however, Pulluaim was able to recover from both knockdowns. Despite this, Mielnicki was declared the winner via comfortable unanimous decision. On February 27, 2021, Mielnicki fought against Noe Alejandro Lopez. Mielnicki controlled the bout from the outset, and in the second round managed to knock his opponent down with a right hand. Mielnicki secured victory in the third round after he landed a barrage of punches on Lopez which forced the referee to end the bout.

On April 17, 2021, Mielnicki suffered his first defeat as a professional in a bout against James Martin. Martin won via majority decision after outworking Mielnicki throughout the duration of the fight. On July 31, 2021, Mielnicki was due to face James Martin in an immediate rematch. It was announced on the day of the weigh-in that Martin would be unable to make the contracted weight, so Mielnicki would instead fight Noah Kidd. In the opening round, Mielnicki landed a left hook which knocked his opponent down. In the second round, Mielnicki continued to pressure Kidd and in the closing moments of the round, Mielnicki landed a combination of punches which forced his opponent to take a knee. This prompted the referee to step in and end the bout.

On December 25, 2021, Mielnicki fought against Nicholas DeLomba. During the third round, Mielnicki hurt DeLomba after landing a heavy right hand to the head of his opponent. After dominating the remainder of the bout, Mielnicki secured victory in the final round after hurting his opponent with another right hand, which resulted in the referee ending the bout upon the request of DeLomba’s trainer. Mielnicki fought against Dan Karpency on the undercard of Errol Spence Jr. vs. Yordenis Ugas on April 16, 2022. Mielnicki won via wide unanimous decision after controlling the duration of the bout.

On July 30, 2022, Mielnicki faced Jimmy Williams. In the sixth round, Mielnicki connected with a right hand which appeared to hurt his opponent. Towards the end of the sixth round, Williams' corner called an end to the bout in an effort to protect their fighter from sustaining further damage. On October 15, 2022, Mielnicki fought Limberth Ponce in a ten round bout. Mielnicki won via wide unanimous decision after outboxing his opponent throughout the course of the bout.

Professional boxing record

References

External links

2002 births
Living people
Boxers from New Jersey
Welterweight boxers
Light-middleweight boxers
People from Belleville, New Jersey
Sportspeople from Essex County, New Jersey